The HŽ series 6111 is an electric multiple unit used by Croatian Railways, formerly the class JŽ 441 of ŽTP Zagreb during the period of Yugoslav Railways. The vehicles were built by Ganz, Hungary (production started in1979). Most of the sets were later modernized by TŽV Gredelj between 2002 and 2015, including both interior and exterior modifications.

Between 1992 and mid-2010's, the principal purpose of the units was to serve Zagreb Commuter Rail where they operated exclusively, in addition to some other electrified lines in short to medium distance from Zagreb. Between 2011 and 2024, however, they were entirely replaced by the HŽ 6112 series on Zagreb suburban lines, so remained 6 111 sets were mostly returned to serve some of the lines on other regional routes across the country. 

After the electric traction system on the section Moravice - Rijeka - Šapjane (border with Slovenia) was changed from 3 kV to 25 kV in 2012, the 6 111 series was given the opportunity to operate on the lines between Zagreb and Rijeka, as well as on the Rijeka suburban traffic line.

Following continued delivery of the new 6 112 units for regional traffic during 2010's and 2020's, 6 111 units were gradually phased out of the company's active rolling stock. 

A meter gauge version of this trainset was also produced for use on the Sahel Metro in Tunisia; these units were known as the YZ-E sets. The trains have been retired in 2010 and replaced by newly-built Hyundai Rotem units.

References

External links

 http://www.railfaneurope.net/

6111

25 kV AC multiple units